Charles Henri Adrien Amberger (9 January 1882 – 2 May 1901) was a French cyclist. He competed at the 1900 Summer Olympics in the men's sprint. He did not finish in the third heat of the first round.

References

External links

1882 births
1901 deaths
Olympic cyclists of France
French male cyclists
Cyclists at the 1900 Summer Olympics
Cyclists from Paris